A list of tallest structures and buildings in Austria. The list contains all types of structures. Please expand and correct this list.
The tallest buildings are listed in the List of tallest buildings in Austria.

Destroyed/demolished structures

External links 
Skyscraperpage.com
http://eaip.austrocontrol.at/lo/091218/PART_2/LO_ENR_5_4_en.pdf

Tallest structures
Austria